Mark Hinckley Willes (born July 16, 1941) is a business leader who was most recently the chief executive officer of Deseret Management Corporation from 2009 to 2012.

Willes was born in Salt Lake City, Utah, to Joseph S. Willes and Ruth Hinckley. His mother was a sister of Gordon B. Hinckley, the 15th president of the Church of Jesus Christ of Latter-day Saints (LDS Church). Willes graduated from West High School in Salt Lake City. He received a bachelor's degree and Ph.D. from Columbia University.

After graduating from Columbia, Willes became a professor at the Wharton School of Business and a researcher with the Philadelphia Branch of the Federal Reserve Bank.  He later left Wharton and became Vice President of the Philadelphia Federal Reserve.

Willes served a term as president of the Federal Reserve Bank of Minneapolis from 1977 to 1980. While in this position he pushed for researchers to examine rational expectations theory. He also was often a dissenting vote in meetings of the Fed's Federal Open Market Committee.

He later served as an executive with General Mills where, among other positions, he served as president, Chief Operating Officer, and vice chairman of the Board of Directors. For his cost-cutting and elimination of many jobs, he was widely dubbed "The Cereal Killer".

Willes was CEO of Times Mirror Company from 1995 to 2000. He took over a company that in its central property, the Los Angeles Times (Times), had been struggling through downsizing and declines since the start of 1990. In 1997, Willes took on the additional duty of being publisher of the Times. In this position he tried to expand the newspaper's outreach by starting a section aimed at Latino readers. At the same time, he cut staffing and the extent of international coverage. Willes also pushed to end the wall of separation between the business and news sides of the newspaper. He majorly increased the level of profits of the Times while he ran it.

Willes is a member of LDS Church. Willes served for almost a decade as president of the church's Minneapolis Minnesota Stake. Willes and his wife, Laura, are the parents of five children.

After the Tribune Company purchased Times Mirror, Willes retired.  He then worked for about a year as a business professor at Brigham Young University (BYU).  He then served from 2001 to 2004 as president of the LDS Church's Hawaii Honolulu Mission.  Beginning in 2005, Willes served as chairman of the board of the Polynesian Cultural Center, having first became a member of the board in 1996. He was a major donor to the construction of the canoe learning compound. BYU-Hawaii renamed their Center for International Entrepreneurship as the Mark and Laura Willes Center for International Entrepreneurship.

Willes donated to BYU's Neal A. Maxwell Center for Religious Scholarship, which led to the 2007 establishment of the Laura F. Willes Center for Book of Mormon Studies, as part of the center.

Notes

References
"Media: Some forks in the road after journalism", New York Times, February 4, 2002
Deseret News, March 12, 2010
"A general whose time ran out", New York Times March 15, 2000
'"New home for Deseret Book", Church News, May 16, 2009
"Times mirror goes outside for new chief", New York Times May 2, 1995
Marriott Magazine Summer 2001 article on Mark Willes

External links
Statements and speeches of Mark H. Willes

1941 births
American chief executives
American leaders of the Church of Jesus Christ of Latter-day Saints
American publishers (people)
Brigham Young University faculty
Businesspeople from Salt Lake City
Columbia College (New York) alumni
Hinckley family
Latter Day Saints from Hawaii
Latter Day Saints from Minnesota
Latter Day Saints from New York (state)
Latter Day Saints from Pennsylvania
Latter Day Saints from Utah
Living people
Mission presidents (LDS Church)
University of Pennsylvania faculty